My Name Is Oona is a 1969 American avant-garde short film directed by Gunvor Nelson. It uses footage of her daughter Oona that has been optically printed, with Oona's voice used for the soundtrack. The film was selected for preservation in the National Film Registry in 2019.

Summary
Footage of Gunvor's daughter Oona saying her name multiple times and days of the week edited into an expressive rhythmical structure that accompanies the visual structure of the film that plunges into the experience of a child.

Production
My Name Is Oona began with footage of Oona that Gunvor optically printed. Inspiration for the film's soundtrack came when Nelson attended a Steve Reich concert. Gunvor recorded Oona saying her name in different ways, and after hearing about the project, Reich sent Gunvor a recording he had made of Oona saying the days of the week. Gunvor worked with Patrick Gleeson to create the audio track. Once that was complete, Nelson made a final cut of the film by editing the image track based on the audio.

Reception and legacy
When My Name Is Oona screened at the Whitney Museum, Danny Weiss of Show Business Illustrated identified it as a standout, calling it a lyrical film that "ends leaving the viewer a little high." In The Village Voice, Amos Vogel declared it "one of the most perfect recent examples of poetic cinema."

In 2019, the film was selected by the U.S. Library of Congress for preservation in the National Film Registry for being "culturally, historically, or aesthetically significant".

References

External links
 
 My Name Is Oona at Canyon Cinema
 My Name Is Oona on MUBI

1960s avant-garde and experimental films
1960s American films
1960s English-language films
1969 short films
American black-and-white films
American short films
Films directed by Gunvor Nelson
Non-narrative films
United States National Film Registry films